Challock  is a mostly wooded, large village and civil parish in the Borough of Ashford, Kent, England.
The village name derives from the old English 'Cealfloca' - calf enclosure. 
It dates from around AD823.

Challock contains a boundary to one of the highest points on the North Downs: the  contour is close to the village centre. Snowfall in January and February is occasionally heavy, when counter-prevailing north-easterly winds exist in those months.

Challock is at the crossroads of two major roads: the A251 from Ashford to Faversham, and the A252, which links Maidstone to Canterbury. Prior to the construction of a roundabout, the crossroads was a notorious accident hotspot for drivers coming from Chilham and Ashford, due in part to the Halfway House public house which stands close to the corner.

William the Conqueror gave the manor of Challock to Battle Abbey, and it remained in the Abbey's possession until the dissolution of the monasteries by Henry VIII in the 16th century. A smock mill stood to the north of the village until 1906 when it was destroyed by a storm - the mill had not been working for many years prior to this event.   
The parish church is dedicated to Saints Cosmas and Damian; it has fine wall paintings by celebrated local artist John Ward and his friend Gordon Davies. There is also a Methodist chapel in the village. A Goose Fair is held in September each year.

The showjumper William Funnell was born and raised in the village.

References

External links

 Village website
 Photo of Parish church interior
 History of Challock

Villages in Kent
Villages in the Borough of Ashford
Civil parishes in Ashford, Kent